The men's special figures was one of four events in figure skating at the 1908 Summer Olympics. Each nation could enter up to 3 skaters. Gold medalist Nikolai Panin's real name was Nikolai Kolomenkin, but he competed under the pseudonym "Panin".

Competition format

Each skater had to complete four voluntary figures. Scores from 0 to 6 were given for each figure for both (a) content (difficulty and novelty) and (b) performance. The total possible score was therefore 48. Each judge would then arrange the skaters in order of total score by that judge; these ordinal rankings were used to provide final placement for the skaters, using a "majority rule"--if a majority of the judges ranked a pair first, the pair won. If there was no majority, the total ordinals controlled. Ties were broken by total points.

Results

The judges were unanimous in ranking Panin first, Cumming second, and Hall-Say third. The Official Report states that Panin "was far in advance of his opponents, both in the difficulty of his figures, and in the ease and accuracy of their execution." Cummings is described as "skating with much facility and accuracy," while the report contends that Hall-Say was "not yet sufficiently experienced in the international style to himself full justice in a competition, his form being inferior to his execution."

Referee:
  Herbert G. Fowler

Judges:
  Henning Grenander
  Edvard Hörle
  Gustav Hügel
  Hermann Wendt
  Georg Sanders

References

Sources
 
 De Wael, Herman. Herman's Full Olympians: "Figure skating 1908". Accessed 2 May 2006.

Men's special figures
1908 in figure skating
Men's events at the 1908 Summer Olympics